Whichford is a village and civil parish in Warwickshire, England, about  southeast of Shipston-on-Stour.

The 2011 Census recorded the parish's population as 336.

Manor and toponymy
The Domesday Book of 1086 records Wicford as a manor of 15 hides. In a document of about 1130 the name is spelt Wicheforda. Its etymology is not certain but it may mean "Ford of the Hwicce", who were an Anglo-Saxon tribe that settled and founded a kingdom in the area in the latter part of the 6th century AD.

Ascott is a common English name meaning "eastern cottage(s)".

Parish church
The oldest part of the Church of England parish church of St Michael is the 12th-century Norman south doorway. The nave and part of the chancel are also 12th-century. In the 13th century the chancel was enlarged and the north aisle was added. There were many alterations in the 14th century including the addition of the northwest tower, south chapel and insertion of several new windows. The nave clerestory was added in the 15th century. St Michael's is a Grade II listed building.

St Michael's west tower has a ring of eight bells. William Bagley of Chacombe, Northamptonshire cast the sixth bell in 1695. William Taylor, who at the time had bell-foundries at Loughborough and Oxford, cast the seventh bell in 1848. John Taylor & Co of Loughborough cast the third, fourth, fifth and tenor bells in 1904. At the time these completed a ring of six bells. The ring was increased to eight in 1998, when John Taylor & Co cast and hung the present treble and second bells. St Michael's has also a Sanctus bell that William Bagley cast in 1706.

Whichford House

Whichford House was built in the 17th century as St Michael's rectory. In the 18th century it was enhanced with an open stairwell, and a stone chimneypiece and wooden panelling in one of the principal rooms. The House is a Grade II* listed building.

Notable people
 George Rainbird (1905-1986), British publisher, lived at Whichford House

Amenities

Whichford has a pub, the Norman Knight.

References

Bibliography

External links

Whichford and Ascott

Civil parishes in Warwickshire
Villages in Warwickshire